Eukaryotic translation elongation factor 1 beta 2 pseudogene 2 (eEF1B3) is a protein that in humans is encoded by the EEF1B2P2 gene.

See also 
eEF-1

References